This article lists some of the events that took place in the Netherlands in 2010.

Incumbents
Monarch: Beatrix
Prime Minister: Jan Peter Balkenende until October 14. After October 14 Mark Rutte

Events

January

February
 20: The question of to extend the mission in Afghanistan causes the fall of the 4th Balkenende administration.

March
 10: 12 year old Milly Boele from Dordrecht is missing. Later on she turns out to have been murdered by neighbour and police officer Sander Vreeswijk. On March 17 her body is found in his garden. 
 16–19: Prince Willem-Alexander visits the Dutch soldiers of Task Force Uruzgan in Afghanistan. 
24: Former SS member Heinrich Boere is sentenced to a lifetime imprisonment for his involvement in the assassination 3 Dutch citizens during World War II.

April

May
 4: The national Remembrance of the Dead is interrupted during the 2 minutes of silence; 63 people get injured during the chaos and confusion that followed.

June
 1-3: Queen Beatrix brings a state-visit to Norway. She arrives in harbor of Oslo with the Air-defense- and Command-frigate Hr. Ms. Tromp and is welcomed by salute shots.

July

August
1:  Operation Task Force Uruzgan ends in Afghanistan and is succeeded by coalition partners.

September

October
 1: the squatting ban goes into effect. 
 10: The Dutch Antilles are absolved: Curaçao and Sint Maarten continue as autonomous countries within the kingdom, the BES-islands (Saba, Saint Eustatius and Bonaire) become Dutch municipalities. 
 14: Installment of the Rutte I administration.

November
 29: Snowfall causes the biggest evening peak traffic jam ever in the country, with a total length of 884 kilometers.

December
 4: The Herziene Statenvertaling is officially presented in the Grote Kerk, Dordrecht

Elections
January 22:Netherlands Antilles general election, 2010. Twenty-two members of the Estates were elected.  
March 3: Dutch municipal elections, 2010.
June 9: Dutch general election, 2010. Mark Rutte became Prime Minister.

Sports
 April 25 - May 6: 2009–10 KNVB Cup finals. 
 May 2: FC Twente wins the Eredivisie for the first time by beating NAC Breda.
 June 11 - July 11: Netherlands national football team 2010 participated in the 2010 FIFA World Cup. They lost the 2010 FIFA World Cup Final to Spain.
 July 31: 2010 Johan Cruijff Schaal
 August 8: Ellen van Dijk wins the 2010 Sparkassen Giro
 August 16: Merab Jordania becomes the new owner of soccer club SBV Vitesse from Arnhem.
 October 17: Getu Feleke wins the Amsterdam Marathon
 October 24: Feyenoord suffers its worst defeat (10-0) ever at the hands of PSV Eindhoven.
 October 31: The Dutch national korfball team win the European Championship korfball by beating Belgium in the final with 25–21.

See also
Netherlands in the Eurovision Song Contest 2010
Netherlands in the Junior Eurovision Song Contest 2010
List of Dutch Top 40 number-one singles of 2010
2010 Dutch cabinet formation
Netherlands at the 2010 Winter Olympics
2010 in Dutch television

References

 
Years of the 21st century in the Netherlands
2010s in the Netherlands